USS Vega may refer to the following ships of the United States Navy:

 , was a  steel-hulled, steam yacht built in 1907; acquired by the U.S. Navy during World War I and sold in 1921
 , a single-screw, steel-hulled freighter built in 1919 and scrapped in 1946
 , was a stores ship launched on 28 April 1955 and sold in 1977

United States Navy ship names